The Parliament of the Khmer Republic was the official name of the bicameral legislature of Cambodia during the Republican period. Elections were held for 32 members of the Senate and all the members of the National Assembly, newly established pursuant to the Constitution approved by popular referendum on April 30, 1972. It was replaced by Kampuchean People's Representative Assembly of Khmer Rouge.

Legislature

Senate 
The Senate consisted of 40 members elected for 6 years, half of whom were renewable every 3 years. Three-fifths of the Senators were elected indirectly in the country's different regions, one-fifth by the civil administration, and the remaining fifth by the Council of the Armed Forces.

National Assembly 
The National Assembly consisted of 126 members elected directly for 4 years by popular sovereignty.

Electoral system 
All citizens of either sex who are at least 18 years of age, registered on the electoral lists and in full possession of their civil rights were entitled to vote for members of the National Assembly. The age requirement is 40 to vote for Senators. Electoral lists were revised every 4 years and voting was not compulsory.

Elections

1972 Parliamentary Election

1972 Senate Election

References 

Khmer Rouge
Defunct national legislatures